Abaciscus lutosus is a species of moth belonging to the family Geometridae. It was described by Jeremy Daniel Holloway in 1993. It is known from Borneo.

The wingspan is about 16 mm. Adults were found in lower montane forest and lowland forest.

References

Boarmiini
Moths described in 1993
Moths of Asia